El Sherbini, El Sherbiny or El Sherbeny is an Egyptian surname, named after the Egyptian city of Sherbin.

Notable people with this surname include:
 Gamal El-Sherbini, Egyptian athlete
 Mimi El-Sherbini, Egyptian former footballer
 Mohamed ElSherbini, Egyptian squash player
 Nour El Sherbini, Egyptian squash player

Dakahlia Governorate
Egyptian families